The following outline is provided as an overview of and topical guide to government:

Government –

Government and the State

What is government? 
Government - is a general term which can be used to refer to public bodies organizing the political life of the society. Government can also refer to the collective head of the executive branch of power in a polity.

Public policies -
 Public taxation
 Public defense
 Public education
 Public transportation
 Healthcare
 Environment
 Civil rights
 Working conditions
Legislative power -

Executive power -

Judicial power -

Constitution -

The State 

Five characteristics of a state
 Population
 Territory
 Sovereignty
 Government
 Permanence

Major Political Ideas 

Evolutionary Theory -

Social Contract Theory -

Divine Theory -

Meritocracy -

The Purpose of Government 
Form a More Perfect Union -

Establish Justice -

Insure Domestic Tranquility -

Provide for the Common Defense -

Promote the General Welfare -

Secure the Blessings of Liberty -

History of government 

History of government

Origins of American Government

Our Political Beginnings

Basic concepts of Government 
Ordered government

Limited government

Representative government

Landmark English Documents 
Magna Carta

Petition of Right

English Bill of Rights

English Colonies 
Charter

Royal Colonies - New Hampshire, Massachusetts, New York, New Jersey, Virginia, North Carolina, South Carolina, and Georgia
 Council
 Bicameralism
Proprietary colonies - Maryland, Pennsylvania, Delaware
 Unicameralism
Charter colonies - Connecticut and Rhode Island

The Coming of Independence 
New England Confederation

Albany Plan of Union

Delegate

Boycott

Repeal

Popular sovereignty

Declaration of Independence

Critical Period 
Articles of Confederation

Ratification

Presiding Officer

Creating and Ratifying the Constitution 
Framers of the Constitution -

Virginia Plan -

New Jersey Plan -

Connecticut Compromise -

Three-Fifths Compromise -

Slave Trade Compromise -

Federalists -

Anti-Federalists -

Quorum -

Forms of government

Who Can Participate 
Democracy -

Dictatorship -
 Autocracy -
 Oligarchy -

Geographic Distribution of Power 
Unitary government -

Federal government -

Confederate government (Confederation) -

Relationship Between Legislative and Executive Powers 
Presidential government -

Parliamentary government -

Basic Concepts of Democracy

Foundations 

Popular sovereignty 
Limited government
Human equality

Democracy and the Free Enterprise System 
Free enterprise system -

Law of supply and demand -

Mixed economy -

The Constitution

Six Basic Principles 
Preamble

Articles

Basic Principles 
Popular Sovereignty

Limited Government
 Constitutionalism
 Rule of law
Separation of powers

Checks and balances
 Veto
Judicial review
 Unconstitutional
Federalism

Formal Amendment

Legislature 
Chambers
    Unicameralism
    Multicameralism
    Bicameralism
    Tricameralism
    Tetracameralism

    Upper house (Senate)
    Lower house
Parliament
    Parliamentary system
    Parliamentary group
    Member of Parliament
    International parliament
Parliamentary procedure
    Committee
    Quorum
    Motion (no-confidence)
Types
    Congress (Member of Congress)
    City council (Councillor)
    The Estates

Legislator -

Committee member -

Trustee -

Delegate -

Partisan -

Politico -

Senator -

Money

Government publications

See also

References

External links 

government